The 2000 Palmer Cup was held on 15–16 August 2000 at Royal Liverpool Golf Club in Hoylake, England. Great Britain and Ireland won 12½–11½. At the final hole of the final match, Phil Rowe holed a 20-foot putt for a birdie, to halve his match and win the Palmer Cup.

Format
On Tuesday, there were four matches of four-ball in the morning, followed by four foursomes matches in the afternoon. Eight singles matches were played on the Wednesday morning with a further eight more in the afternoon.. In all, 24 matches were played.

Each of the 24 matches was worth one point in the larger team competition. If a match was all square after the 18th hole, each side earned half a point toward their team total. The team that accumulated at least 12½ points won the competition.

Teams
Eight college golfers from the Great Britain and Ireland and the United States participated in the event.

Tuesday's matches

Morning four-ball

Afternoon foursomes

Wednesday's matches

Morning singles

Afternoon singles

References

External links
Palmer Cup official site

Arnold Palmer Cup
Golf tournaments in England
Palmer Cup
Palmer Cup
Palmer Cup